Penja is a possibly extinct Bantu language of southern Tanzania, near the north end of Lake Malawi.

References

Rukwa languages